Hibiscus micranthus, the tiny flower hibiscus, is a widespread species of flowering plant in the family Malvaceae. A shrub, it is native to seasonally dry tropical areas of Africa, Madagascar, the Arabian Peninsula, Iran, the Indian Subcontinent, and Myanmar. It is used in traditional medicines.

References

micranthus
Flora of Africa
Flora of Madagascar
Flora of Sinai
Flora of Palestine (region)
Flora of the Arabian Peninsula
Flora of Iran
Flora of Pakistan
Flora of India (region)
Flora of Sri Lanka
Flora of Bangladesh
Flora of Myanmar
Plants described in 1782